Oberwampach is a village in the commune of Wincrange, in northern Luxembourg.  , the village had a population of 172.

Oberwampach was a commune in the canton of Clervaux until 1 January 1978, when it was merged with the communes of Asselborn, Boevange, and Hachiville to form the new commune of Wincrange.  The law creating Wincrange was passed on 31 October 1977.

During the Battle of the Bulge, Oberwampach was the stage of a fierce battle between German and American troops in January 1945.

Former commune
The former commune consisted of the villages:

 Allerborn
 Brachtenbach
 Derenbach
 Niederwampach
 Schimpach
 Oberwampach
 Birkenhof (lieu-dit)
 Buschweg (lieu-dit)
 Schimpach-Station (lieu-dit)

People
Soldier and military engineer Johan Caspar von Cicignon was born in Oberwampach circa 1625.

Footnotes

Villages in Luxembourg
Wincrange
Former communes of Luxembourg